Michelle Janine Howard (born April 30, 1960) is a retired United States Navy four-star admiral who last served as the commander of United States Naval Forces Europe while she concurrently was the commander of United States Naval Forces Africa and commander of Allied Joint Force Command Naples. She previously was the 38th Vice Chief of Naval Operations. She assumed her last assignment on June 7, 2016.

Howard achieved many historical firsts throughout her naval career. She was the first African-American woman to command a United States Navy ship, and the first to achieve two- and three-star rank. In 2006, she was selected for the rank of rear admiral (lower half), making her the first admiral selected from the United States Naval Academy class of 1982 and the first female graduate of the United States Naval Academy selected for flag rank. On July 1, 2014, Howard was appointed Vice Chief of Naval Operations, the second highest ranking officer in the Navy.

Upon her swearing in, Howard became the highest-ranking woman and first female four-star admiral in United States Naval history. Howard also became the first female four-star admiral to command operational forces, when she assumed command of United States Naval Forces Europe and Naval Forces Africa. Howard retired on December 1, 2017 after nearly 36 years of service in the United States Navy.

In 2021, Howard was appointed to The Naming Commission, a congressional commission created to rename U.S. military assets and locations with names associated with the Confederate States of America (CSA), and was sworn in as its chair in March.

Early life and education
Howard was born at March Air Force Base in California, the daughter of United States Air Force master sergeant Nick Howard, and his wife, Phillipa. Howard is a 1978 graduate of Gateway High School in Aurora, Colorado. She graduated from the United States Naval Academy with a Bachelor of Science in 1982 and from the United States Army Command and General Staff College in 1998 with a Master of Military Art and Science.

Naval career

While serving on board USS Lexington, she received the Secretary of the Navy/Navy League Captain Winifred Collins award in May 1987. This award is given to one woman officer a year for outstanding leadership. She assumed duties as First Lieutenant on board  in July 1992. Sixty days after returning from the Mediterranean deployment, Tortuga departed on a West African Training Cruise, where the ship's sailors, with embarked U.S. Marines and U.S. Coast Guard detachment, operated with the naval services of seven African nations.

Howard commanded Amphibious Squadron 7 from May 2004 to September 2005. Deploying with Expeditionary Strike Group 5, operations included tsunami relief efforts in Indonesia and maritime security operations in the North Persian Gulf.

Howard's shore assignments include: Course Coordinator/Instructor for the Steam Engineering Officer of the Watch (EOOW) course; Action Officer and Navy's liaison to the Defense Advisory Committee on Women in the Military Services (DACOWITS) in the Bureau of Personnel; Action Officer J-3, Global Operations, Readiness on the Joint Staff from 2001–2003; Executive Assistant to the Joint Staff Director of Operations from February 2003 to February 2004; and Deputy Director N3 on the OPNAV Staff from December 2005 to July 2006.

Howard was the Deputy Director, Expeditionary Warfare Division, OPNAV staff from July 2006 to December 2006, and senior military assistant to the secretary of the Navy January 2007 – January 2009. She was chief of staff to the director for Strategic Plans and Policy, J-5, Joint Staff from August 2010 until July 2012. From August 2012 to July 2013 she was Deputy Commander, United States Fleet Forces Command headquartered in Norfolk, Virginia.

Howard assumed command of Expeditionary Strike Group 2 and Combined Task Force 151 (CTF 151) aboard the amphibious assault ship  in April 2009. Boxer was the flagship for CTF 151, a multinational task force established to conduct counter-piracy operations in the Indian Ocean. She played a key role in the rescue of Captain Richard Phillips, whose kidnapping by Somali pirates became a major motion picture film.

Howard was promoted to rear admiral (lower half), effective September 1, 2007 and to rear admiral, effective August 1, 2010. She was promoted to vice admiral on August 24, 2012.

On July 1, 2014, Howard was promoted to admiral. She became the 38th Vice Chief of Naval Operations the same day.

Dates of ranks

Career after retiring from the Navy

After Howard retired from the Navy on December 1, 2017, she became the J.B. and Maurice C. Shapiro Visiting Professor of International Affairs at George Washington University, teaching cybersecurity and international policy. IBM announced that it appointed Howard to its board, effective March 1, 2019.

In November 2020, Howard was named a volunteer member of the Joe Biden presidential transition Agency Review Team to support transition efforts related to the Defense Department. On February 12, 2021, Secretary of Defense Lloyd Austin appointed Howard as one of four Departmental representatives to the Commission on the Naming of Items of the Department of Defense that Commemorate the Confederate States of America or Any Person Who Served Voluntarily with the Confederate States of America. She was sworn in as the commission's chair on March 2, 2021.

Awards and decorations

Howard is the recipient of the 2008 Women of Color Science Technology Engineering and Math (STEM) Career Achievement Award, 2009 Dominion Power Strong Men and Women Excellence in Leadership Award, and the 2011 USO Military Woman of the Year.

On February 1, 2013, Howard was honored with the "Chairman's Award" at the 44th NAACP Image Awards. She is a 1987 recipient of the Secretary of the Navy/Navy League Captain Winifred Collins Award.

On June 13, 2015, Howard was awarded the Doctor of Public Service honorary degree from the American Public University System for her many years of service in the United States Navy, her contribution to the advancement of women in the United States Military, and to her continued service to the people of the United States and around the world.

On May 22, 2021, Howard was the speaker for the commencement ceremonies at Fordham University, where she received an honorary doctorate of humane letters for her achievements and leadership in the U.S. armed forces .

See also
 List of female United States military generals and flag officers

References

Further reading

External links 

 
 

1960 births
African-American female military personnel
American people of British descent
Female admirals of the United States Navy
Living people
People from Riverside County, California
Recipients of the Defense Distinguished Service Medal
Recipients of the Defense Superior Service Medal
Recipients of the Legion of Merit
United States Army Command and General Staff College alumni
United States Naval Academy alumni
United States Navy admirals
Vice Chiefs of Naval Operations
Women corporate directors
Recipients of the Humanitarian Service Medal
21st-century African-American people
21st-century African-American women
20th-century African-American people
20th-century African-American women
African-American United States Navy personnel